is a 1989 run and gun video game developed for arcades and published in Japan by Namco. It was re-released on the Wii Virtual Console on August 25, 2009.

Gameplay

The player must take control of a Transformer-like battlemech known as Sygnus, who is equipped with a laser cannon, Vernier jump-jets, auto-targeting, and an automatic cooling system. Pushing that joystick twice in the same direction will make Sygnus switch from a march to a dash while he is moving, and the player may not make him change the direction that he is facing in mid-air. He has no "life meter", just a temperature meter which increases when he is hit, and decreases when he is not hit - but, if the timer should run out, his cooling device will break. If he should overheat, the game will immediately be over. The game is made of four stages which must be finished twice.

Reception
In Japan, Game Machine listed Finest Hour on their October 15, 1989 issue as being the eighth most-successful table arcade game of the year.

Notes

References

1989 video games
Arcade video games
Japan-exclusive video games
Namco arcade games
Run and gun games
Video games developed in Japan
Virtual Console games